The Hanwon Museum of Art is an art museum in Seoul, South Korea.

See also
List of museums in South Korea

External links
Official site

Art museums and galleries in Seoul